Storm Riders is a reality television series following two meteorologists as they travel across the Great Plains of the United States in search of thunderstorms. Storm Riders was seen on The Weather Channel.

Synopsis
Meteorologists Simon Brewer and Juston Drake explain how storms form, using every day technology.

Cast

Simon Brewer, meteorologist 
Simon Brewer is a meteorologist and storm chaser from Norman, Oklahoma. He received his degree in Meteorology from the University of Oklahoma in 2008. He chases and reportedly documents extreme weather phenomena.

After a decade of chasing storms, he claims to have witnessed hundreds of tornadoes, eight hurricanes, two tropical storms, dozens of winter storms and thousands of supercells. He documented the 2nd widest tornado in history: a 2.5 mile wide monster that struck Hallam, NE. He intercepted the eyes of three major hurricanes, including Hurricane Katrina, one of the worst natural disasters in US history.

Juston Drake, meteorologist 
Juston Drake is a meteorologist and storm chaser from Topeka, Kansas. His interest in weather stems arose from listening to his mother's stories of when an F5 tornado destroyed her home.

Juston has been chasing storms for 5 years. He has witnessed numerous tornadoes, supercells, and hurricanes. His degree in meteorology allows him to collect data and document the storm.

Carl Bishop, Narrator 
Carl Bishop is a voice actor who has worked for a number of notable companies and figures.

Seasons

Season 1 (2009-10)

Season 2 (2011)

Season 3 (2011-2012)

Season 4 (2013)

References

External links
 Stormgasm

2011 American television series debuts
2013 American television series endings
2010s American reality television series
The Weather Channel original programming
Storm chasing